Clystea rubipectus is a moth of the subfamily Arctiinae. It was described by William Schaus in 1898. It is found on Hispaniola.

References

Clystea
Moths described in 1898